Ranford is an English-language surname, a variation of the toponymic surname Rainford from the village Rainford, Lancashire. Notable people with the surname include:

 Bill Ranford (born 1966), Canadian ice hockey player
 Brendan Ranford (born 1992), Canadian ice hockey player

See also 
 
 Ranford (disambiguation)
 Rainforth, variant spelling
 Rainsford, variant spelling

References 

English-language surnames
English toponymic surnames